A jar is a type of rigid, cylindrical container.

Jar(s), JAR, or The Jar(s) may also refer to:

Arts and entertainment

Film
 The Jar, a 1984 American horror film directed by Bruce Toscano
 The Jar: A Tale From the East, a 2001 Syrian animated film
 JAR Pictures, an Indian motion picture production company

Literature
 "The Jar", a 1944 story by Ray Bradbury

Music 
 The Jars, an American new wave band 1978–1982
 Flybanger, originally Jar, a Canadian metal band
 JaR, the duo Jay Graydon and Randy Goodrum
 Jar (album), by Superheaven, 2013
 "J.A.R.", a song by Green Day, 1995
 "Jars" (song), by Chevelle, 2009
 "Jars", a song by Downthesun from Downthesun, 2002
 "Jars", a song by the Black Dahlia Murder from Nightbringers, 2017

Military and government
 Jar (unit), an obsolete Royal Navy unit of capacitance
 Joint Aviation Requirements, issued by Europe's Joint Aviation Authorities
 Order of the Jar, a medieval Spanish military order

People
 Alexandru Jar (1911–1988), Romanian poet and novelist
 Gabriel Jars (1732–1769), French mining and metallurgical specialist

Places

Places
 Car, Azerbaijan, a village in Zaqatala District, Azerbaijan
 Jar, Iran, in Isfahan Province
 Jar, Kurdistan, Iran
 Jar, Norway, in Bærum
 Jar station, an Oslo Metro and the Oslo Tramway station
 Jar IL, a sports club
 Jars, Cher, France
 Jewish Autonomous Oblast, or Jewish Autonomous Region, Russia
 Plain of Jars, Laos

Structures
 JAR Stadium, in Tashkent, Uzbekistan
 James A. Rhodes Arena, on the campus of the University of Akron, Ohio, US
 John A. Ryan Arena, a hockey rink in Watertown, Massachusetts, US

Science and technology
 Jamming avoidance response, of weakly electric fish
 JAR (file format), Java ARchive file
 Drilling jar, part of a well drill string

Other uses
 Jarawa language (Nigeria) (ISO 639-3 code)
 Jar, a Procter & Gamble brand

See also
 
 
 Ajar (disambiguation)
 Jaar (disambiguation)
 Jarra (disambiguation)
 Jarre, a surname
 Jareš, a surname